Zoe Eliana Miller (born November 11, 2005) is an American artistic gymnast and a member of the United States women's national gymnastics team. She was a member of the team who won silver at the  2022 Pan American Gymnastics Championships.

Early life 
Miller was born in Hartford, Connecticut, to Clara and Moulton Miller and has one sibling.

Gymnastics Career

Junior Elite

2019 
In June, Miller competed at the American Classic, where she placed 5th in the all-around and balance beam and a 6th place finish on the uneven bars. She also competed in the G.K U.S. Classic, placing 6th on the uneven bars and 12th in the all-around. Miller qualified for the 2019 U.S. National Gymnastics Championships, where she placed 14th in the all-around and was not named to the national team.

Senior Elite

2021 
In February, Miller competed at the 2021 Winter Cup where she placed 5th on uneven bars, 7th on floor, and 8th in the all-around. She later competed at the U.S. Classic where she placed 4th on the uneven bars and 14th in the all-around. In June, Miller placed 6th on the uneven bars and 17th in the all-around 2021 U.S. National Gymnastics Championships where she was named to the National Team. Later that month, she competed in the U.S Olympic Trials, ultimately placing 12th.

2022 
In February, Miller competed in the Winter cup placing 8th on uneven bars and 14th in the all-around.  In her international debut, she competed in the City of Jesolo Trophy placing 1st in the team competition and 7th in the all-around.  In July she was selected to compete at the upcoming Pan American Championships alongside Kayla DiCello, Skye Blakely, Elle Mueller, and Lexi Zeiss.  On the first day of competition she won silver on uneven bars behind Rebeca Andrade. During the team final Miller competed only on uneven bars, earning the highest score on the apparatus and helping the United States win silver behind Brazil.

References 

2005 births
Living people
American female artistic gymnasts
U.S. women's national team gymnasts
21st-century American women